Pinewood Toronto Studios (formerly known as Filmport) is a major film and television studio complex in Toronto, Ontario, Canada and is the largest of its kind in Canada. It is the first in Toronto capable of accommodating the production of large-scale films. 
The studio is named for the British Pinewood Studios Group. In March 2018, it was announced that Bell Media would be buying a controlling stake in the studio.

It is located across the shipping channel from Hearn Generating Station along Commissioners Street.

History

The Port Lands site was originally a brownfield site owned by Imperial Oil, and required considerable cleanup prior to reuse.

Initial work on the complex began in August 2006.

In June 2009, the studio entered into a comprehensive sales and marketing agreement with the Pinewood Studios Group, resulting in the facility being renamed Pinewood Toronto Studios.

Pinewood Toronto Studios was constructed to be a "green" facility with a number of environmental considerations.

In March 2018, Bell Media reached a deal with the UK-based Pinewood studios group, the City of Toronto government, and several holdings companies to purchase a controlling stake in the studio. As part of the deal, Bell Media announced that an additional 170,000 square feet of sound stages would be built at Pinewood Toronto to ease scarcity of production space in Toronto.

Stages and facilities

Expansion
In November 2020, the company reported that an expansion has commenced, with a plan of adding over 200,000 square feet to the campus. The announcement specified that the expansion would "include five new sound stages (totaling 102,000 square feet), 58,000 square feet of office and support space, and 15,000 square feet dedicated to a mill shop and workshop". When the work is finished, the Toronto location will offer a total of 16 sound stages.

Filmography

 Battle of the Blades (CBC)
 Breakout Kings (20th Century Fox Television)
 Casino Jack (ATO Pictures)
 Chloe (Sony Pictures)
 Devil (Universal Pictures)
 Dream House (Universal Pictures) 
 Happy Town (ABC)
 Scott Pilgrim vs. the World (Universal Pictures)
 Sundays at Tiffany's (Lifetime Television)
 Take This Waltz (Mongrel Media)
 The Thing (Universal Pictures)
 Total Recall (Columbia Pictures) 
 Kick-Ass 2 (Universal Pictures)
 Carrie
 Pacific Rim
 Crimson Peak
 RoboCop
 Pixels
 Suicide Squad
 Debug
 Star Trek: Discovery
 It
 Shazam!
 It: Chapter Two (Warner Bros. Pictures)
 How to Eat Fried Worms (Warner Bros. Pictures)

References

External links
 

Buildings and structures in Toronto
Canadian film studios